Middletown is an unincorporated community in Liberty Township, Shelby County, in the U.S. state of Indiana.

History
Middletown was platted in 1829.

Geography

References

Unincorporated communities in Shelby County, Indiana
Unincorporated communities in Indiana